Wilson Lloyd Bevan (1866-1935) was an American historian.

Biography 
Wilson Lloyd Bevan was born 17 June 1866 in Baltimore County, Maryland. He was the son of George Frazier Bevan.

In 1886 Wilson Lloyd Bevan ("of Baltimore")  was a "candidate for the degree of Bachelor of Arts" on Johns Hopkins University.
Later he earned his degree of Master of Arts from Columbia University, New York City. 
At the University of Munich (Germany) he got his PhD degree.

He served as professor of history at Sewanee: the University of the South, Tenn.
and subsequently at Kenyon College, Ohio.

He was engaged in journalism and for many years he was the New York Churchman'''s Associate Editor.

In 1920 he started at the University of Delaware as associate professor of history. 

In 1926 he was a minister. In that year he was mentioned as "The Rev. Wilson Lloyd Bevan, M.A., Columbia; S.T.B., General; Ph. D. Munich", Professor of Systematic Divinity and Acting Professor of Philosophy at the University of the South.

Wilson Lloyd Bevan married first to Mary Kaylett, then to Caroline Eckel, about 1926. He died 8 April 1935.

 Bibliography 
 1893: (part of) dissertation (Munich): Sir William Petty. Canterbury : J.A. Jennings. 32 pgs.
 1894: Sir William Petty : A Study in English Economic Literature (published as a 'Publication of the American Economic Association', vol. IX, no. 4)
 1913: The World's Leading Conquerors.''  New York : H. Holt.
 1929:  (4 vols.)

References 

20th-century American historians
American male non-fiction writers
20th-century American male writers